The Spacewatch Project is an astronomical survey that specializes in the study of minor planets, including various types of asteroids and comets at University of Arizona telescopes on Kitt Peak near Tucson, Arizona, in the United States. The Spacewatch Project has been active longer than any other similar currently active programs.

Spacewatch was founded in 1980 by Tom Gehrels and Robert S. McMillan, and is currently led by astronomer Melissa Brucker at the University of Arizona. Spacewatch uses several telescopes on Kitt Peak for follow-up observations of near-Earth objects.

The Spacewatch Project uses three telescopes of apertures 0.9-m, 1.8-m, and 2.3-m. These telescopes are located on Kitt Peak mountain in Arizona, and the first two are dedicated to the purpose of locating Near-Earth Objects (NEOs).

The 36 inch (0.9 meter) telescope on Kitt Peak has been in use by Spacewatch since 1984, and since 2000 the 72 inch (1.8 meter) Spacewatch telescope. The 36 inch telescope continued in use and was further upgraded, in particular the telescopes use electronic detectors.

Spacewatch's 1.8-meter telescope is the largest in the world that is used exclusively for asteroids and comets. It can find asteroids and comets anywhere from the space near Earth to regions beyond the orbit of Neptune and to do astrometry on the fainter of objects that are already known. The telescope is pointed on stars and tracked with a real time video-rate camera at folded prime focus.

Spacewatch was the first to use CCDs to survey the sky for comets and asteroids. When added, they permitted faster coverage of the sky than the pre-2002 system.

Each year, Spacewatch observes approximately 35 radar targets, 50 near-Earth objects, and 100 potential spacecraft rendezvous destinations. From 2013 to 2016, Spacewatch observed half of all NEOs and potentially hazardous asteroids (PHAs) observed by anyone in that time. , Spacewatch had discovered over 179,000 minor planets numbered by the Minor Planet Center.

History 
The 1.8 meter Spacewatch telescope and its building on Kitt Peak were dedicated on June 7, 1997 for the purpose of finding previously unknown asteroids and comets. Since January 1 2003, Spacewatch has made ~2400 separate-night detections of Near-Earth Objects.

There was an upgrade to the 0.9 meter which was funded by NASA and the Kirsch Foundation.

The Spacewatch Project is the longest-running of all present programs of astrometry of solar system objects.

Spacewatch in Action 
Spacewatch conducted a survey that was proposed May 12, 2006, and accepted on November 13, 2006. This survey used data taken over 34 months by the University of Arizona’s Spacewatch Project based at Steward Observatory, Kitt Peak. Spacewatch revisited the same sky area every three to seven nights in order to track cohorts of main-belt asteroids. This survey discovered one new large Kuiper Belt Object (KBO) and detected six others. This proved that new sweeps of the sky are productive even if they have been previously examined simply due to the complexities of running large surveys over many nights and variable conditions.

Notable discoveries 

 Callirrhoe
 5145 Pholus
 9965 GNU
 9885 Linux
 9882 Stallman
 9793 Torvalds
 20000 Varuna
 60558 Echeclus
 , target of JAXA's Hayabusa2 extended mission.
 65803 Didymos, target of the DART mission
 
 
 (136617) 1994 CC
 C/1992 J1
 125P/Spacewatch
 174567 Varda
 
 The project rediscovered 719 Albert, a long-lost asteroid.

See also 
 Planetary Data System (PDS)
 Spaceguard
 List of near-Earth object observation projects

References 
 

Planetary science
Astronomical discoveries by institution

Near-Earth object tracking